A cubic mile (abbreviation: cu mi or mi3) is an imperial and US customary (non-SI non-metric) unit of volume, used in the United States, Canada and the United Kingdom. It is defined as the volume of a cube with sides of 1 mile (63360 inches, 5280 feet, 1760 yards or ~1.609 kilometres) in length.

Conversions

See also 
 Square mile
 Orders of magnitude for a comparison with other volumes
 
 Cube (arithmetic)
 Cube root
 Cubic equation
 Cubic function

References

Units of volume
Imperial units
Customary units of measurement in the United States